Canly is a commune in the Oise department in northern France.

References

Communes of Oise